Actinioidea is a superfamily of sea anemones in the order Actiniaria.

Families classified in the superfamily Actinioidea include:
 Family Actiniidae
 Family Actinodendridae
 Family Andresiidae
 Family Capneidae
 Family Condylanthidae
 Family Haloclavidae
 Family Homostichanthidae
 Family Iosactinidae
 Family Limnactiniidae
 Family Liponematidae
 Family Minyadidae
 Family Oractinidae
 Family Phymanthidae
 Family Preactiniidae
 Family Ptychodactinidae
 Family Stichodactylidae
 Family Thalassianthidae

References

 
Enthemonae
Animal superfamilies